Kris Kocurek ( born November 15, 1978) is an American football coach and former defensive tackle who is the defensive line coach for the San Francisco 49ers of the National Football League (NFL). He previously served as an assistant coach for the Miami Dolphins and Detroit Lions. Kocurek played college football at Texas Tech and was drafted by the Seattle Seahawks in the seventh round of the 2001 NFL Draft. Kocurek also played for the Tennessee Titans.

Coaching career

Texas Tech
In 2003, Kocurek began his coaching career at Texas Tech as a graduate assistant.

Texas A&M–Kingsville
In 2004, Kocurek was hired as a graduate assistant at Texas A&M–Kingsville.

Texas A&M–Commerce
In 2006, Kocurek was hired as a defensive line coach at Texas A&M–Commerce.

West Texas A&M
In 2007, Kocurek was hired as a defensive line and assistant head coach at West Texas A&M.

Stephen F. Austin State
In 2008, Kocurek was hired as a defensive line coach at Stephen F. Austin State.

Detroit Lions
In 2009, Kocurek was hired by the Detroit Lions as an assistant defensive line coach. In 2010, he was promoted to defensive line coach after the retirement of Bob Karmelowicz.

Miami Dolphins
On January 17, 2018, Kocurek was hired by the Miami Dolphins as their defensive line coach.

San Francisco 49ers
On January 15, 2019, Kocurek was hired by the San Francisco 49ers as their defensive line coach.

References

External links
Detroit Lions bio
Stephen F. Austin Lumberjacks bio
Texas Tech Red Raiders bio

1978 births
Living people
American football defensive tackles
Texas Tech Red Raiders football players
Seattle Seahawks players
Tennessee Titans players
Texas Tech Red Raiders football coaches
Texas A&M–Kingsville Javelinas football coaches
Texas A&M–Commerce Lions football coaches
West Texas A&M Buffaloes football coaches
Stephen F. Austin Lumberjacks football coaches
Detroit Lions coaches
San Francisco 49ers coaches